Nicolae Alevra (21 January 1871, Bogdănești, Baia County, Romania – 16 July 1936, Palanca, Bacău County, Romania) was a Romanian brigadier general and politician who held was Minister of Communications in the first government of Iuliu Maniu.

Alevra's military education started at Școala Fiilor de Militari, in Iași, and in 1890 continued in Bucharest, where he graduated in 1892 from Școala militară de Artilerie (Artillery Military School) with the rank of second lieutenant. He studied at Graz, then at the Higher War School (1904–1906). He advanced in rank to captain (1902), major (1910), lieutenant colonel (1914), and colonel (1916).

Alevra served during World War I and was appointed in 1917 to brigadier general. He served as deputy chief of the General High Command, headed by General Constantin Prezan. In 1922 he withdrew from the army to dedicate himself to writing, in December 1927 becoming a member of the National Peasants' Party, which propelled him to serve as communications minister.

In that capacity, he went to the site of the railway accident at Boboc, where in April 1929 a derailed train caused the deaths of 20 people and injured a few dozen others.

He was a proponent of Romanian military doctrine and arts. He appreciated that the national military doctrine must be developed by affirming the principle of the "armed nation." Appreciating that after the achievement of the Great Union of Transylvania, Bessarabia, and Bukovina with the Kingdom of Romania in 1918, Romania would continue to have enemies, Alevra considered that the only war that could be accepted or envisaged was a defensive war. Alevra was elected to the Romanian Academy of Sciences on 21 December 1935.

Works
Necesitatea unei noi legi de recrutare – 1912
Armata de rezervă – 1913
Caracteristicile generale ale unora dintre instituțiile noastre militare – 1913
Noi probleme de organizare – 1913
Modificarea constituției și Armata – 1914
Câteva observațiuni asupra unora dintre regulamentele noastre – 1915
Stabilirea răspunderilor asupra pregătirii armatei pentru război – 1918
Minoritățile și serviciul militar – 1924
Opera Generalului Mărdărescu – 1925
Birocrația în armată – 1927
Legile militare – 1928
Reducerea serviciului militar – 1928
Organizarea armatei – 1930
'Oamenii politici și apărarea națională – 1931
Noi concepte de organizare militară – 1934
Omogenitatea armatei – 1936
Problema effectivelor armatei – 1934
Imponderabili la război. Studiu social militar – 1936

References

1871 births
1936 deaths
People from Suceava County
Carol I National Defence University alumni
Romanian Army World War I generals
National Peasants' Party politicians
Romanian Ministers of Communications
Members of the Romanian Academy of Sciences
20th-century Romanian male writers
Romanian military historians